Rafic Bahaa El Deen Al Hariri (1 November 1944 – 14 February 2005) was a Lebanese business tycoon and politician, who served as the Prime Minister of Lebanon from 1992 to 1998 and again from 2000 until his resignation on .

Hariri headed five cabinets during his tenure. He was widely credited for his role in constructing the Taif Agreement that ended the 15-year Lebanese Civil War. He also played a huge role in reconstructing the Lebanese capital, Beirut. He was the first post-civil war prime minister and the most influential and wealthiest Lebanese politician until his assassination.

Hariri was assassinated on 14 February 2005 by a suicide truck bomb in Beirut. Four Hezbollah members were indicted for the assassination and are being tried in absentia by the Special Tribunal for Lebanon, but others have linked the assassination to the Syrian government. The outcome of a 15-year investigation led to the guilty verdict of multiple people in Hezbollah's party taking part; however, the only one left alive would be Salim Ayyash, a well-connected, mid-level operative in Hezbollah.

The assassination was a catalyst for dramatic political change in Lebanon. The massive protests of the Cedar Revolution helped achieve the withdrawal of Syrian troops and security forces from Lebanon and a change in governments.

At one point, Hariri was one of the world's 100 wealthiest men and the fourth-richest politician.

Early life and education
Hariri was born on 1 November 1944 to a modest Sunni Muslim family in the Lebanese port city of Sidon. He had two siblings (brother Shafic and sister Bahia). He attended elementary and secondary school in Sidon, and graduated in business administration from Beirut Arab University.

Career
In 1965, Hariri went to Saudi Arabia to work. There, he taught for a short period of time before shifting to the construction industry. In 1978, he gained Saudi Arabian citizenship, in addition to his Lebanese citizenship.

In 1969, Hariri established Ciconest, a small subcontracting firm, which soon went out of business. He then went in business with the French construction firm Oger for the construction of a hotel in Ta’if, Saudi Arabia, the timely construction of which earned praise from King Khaled. Hariri took over Oger, forming Saudi Oger, which became the main construction firm used by the Saudi Royal family for all their important developments. As a result, a few years after his first contract with King Khaled, Hariri had become a multi-billionaire.

Having accumulated his wealth, Hariri started a number of philanthropic projects, including the building of educational facilities in Lebanon. His first initiative in Lebanon was the Islamic Association for Culture and Education, which he founded in 1979. The association was later renamed the Hariri Foundation. Hariri became progressively more embroiled in politics. His appeals to the United Nations and services as an emissary to the Saudi Royal family won him international recognition on the political stage for his humanitarian efforts.

In 1982, Hariri donated $12 million to Lebanese victims of the 1978 South Lebanon conflict and helped clean up Beirut's streets with his company's money and contributed to early reconstruction efforts during lulls in the Lebanon war. Said to have heavily financed opposing militias during the war, his former deputy Najah Wakim later accused him of helping to destroy downtown Beirut in order to rebuild it again and make billions of dollars in the process. After the conflict, he acted as an envoy of the Saudi royal family to Lebanon. He laid the groundwork that led to the 1989 Taif Accord, which Saudi Arabia organised to bring the warring factions together. Taif put an end to the civil war, building goodwill for Hariri politically. While acting as the Saudi envoy to Lebanon, he spent more time in Damascus than in Beirut where he ingratiated himself with the Assad regime; he had a new presidential palace built in Damascus as a gift to the Syrian dictator but Assad didn't use it personally.

Political career
Hariri returned to Lebanon in the early 1980s as a wealthy man and began to build a name for himself by making large donations and contributions to various groups in Lebanon. However, he continued to serve as a political advisor to Prince Bandar bin Sultan in 1983. He was implanted as the Saudis' strong man following the collapse of the PLO and the paucity of any viable Sunni leadership in the country as well as a response to the rising power of the Shiite militia Amal. As a former Saudi diplomatic representative, he played a significant role in constructing the 1990 Taif Agreement that ended Lebanon's sixteen-year civil war. In 1992, Hariri became the first post-civil war prime minister of Lebanon under president Elias Hrawi. In addition, he was the minister of finance. After the 1996 elections he also took on the role of minister of post and telecommunications. Hariri put the country back on the financial map through the issuing of Eurobonds and won plaudits from the World Bank for his plan to borrow reconstruction money as the country's debt grew to become the largest per capita in the world. Between 1992 and 1996 the public debt grew from $3 billion to $9 billion. His first premiership lasted until 1998, and Hariri was replaced by Salim Hoss as prime minister. In fact, as a result of the power struggle between Hariri and newly elected president Émile Lahoud, he left office.

In October 2000, Hariri was again appointed prime minister, replacing Salim Hoss, and formed the cabinet. In September 2004, Hariri defended UN Security Council Resolution 1559, which called for "all remaining foreign forces to withdraw from Lebanon." On 20 October 2004, his second term ended when he resigned from office. Omar Karami succeeded him as prime minister.

1992–1998 economic policies 

Hariri implemented an aggressive new economic policy. In 1992 inflation was running at 131% but such was the confidence in Hariri’s leadership that within two years it had been reduced to 12%. Perhaps Hariri's most important creation in the beginning of his career was "Horizon 2000" the government's name for its new rejuvenation plan. A large component of "Horizon 2000" was Solidere, the privately owned construction company that was established to reconstruct post-war Lebanon. Solidere was owned by the government and private investors. Solidere was largely focused on redeveloping Beirut's downtown and turning it into a new urban center as quickly as possible as one aspect of the various infrastructure redevelopment plans that would be implemented by "Horizon 2000". Solidere was given powers of compulsory purchase, compensating in Solidere shares rather than cash, and was accused of harassment and underpaying former land owners. Another aspect of the decade-long plan was the privatization of major industries. Numerous contracts were awarded in important industries such as energy, telecommunications, electricity, airports and roads.

The last and perhaps most significant aspect of "Horizon 2000" was economic stimulus via foreign direct investment. Specifically, Hariri supported foreign firms and individuals taking an interest in Lebanon's developmental potential. Hariri simplified tax codes and provided tax breaks to foreign investors. Due to his previous successes in the private sector and the numerous resulting international connections, Hariri was able to garner a significant amount of low-interest loans from foreign investors. Hariri also pursued aggressive macroeconomic policy such as maintaining strict regulations on bank reserves and inter-bank interest rates to curb inflation and raise the value of the Lebanese pound relative to the dollar.

Hariri's economic policies were a remarkable success during his first year in office. From 1992 to 1993 there was a 6 percent increase in real national income, the capital base of commercial banks effectively doubled, the budgetary earnings hovered at around a billion dollars, and commercial banks' consolidated balance sheets increased about 25%. By 1998, however, real GDP growth was around 1%, a year later it would be -1%, national debt had skyrocketed 540% from two to eighteen billion dollars, Lebanon's economy was in a miserable state.

In 1996 it was estimated that 30% of Lebanon’s population were living below the poverty line and that there were 500,000 Syrian labourers working illegally in the country.

Hariri and Lebanon's political environment 

Amid the political crisis brought on by the extension of President Émile Lahoud's term, Hariri resigned as Prime Minister, saying: "I have... submitted the resignation of the government, and I have declared that I will not be a candidate to head the (next) government."

During a BBC interview in 2001, Harīrī was asked by Tim Sebastian why he refused to hand over members of Hezbollah that were accused by America of being terrorists. He responded that Hezbollah were the ones protecting Lebanon against the Israeli occupation and called for implementation of passed United Nations resolutions against Israel. He was further accused of making the American coalition in the war on terrorism worthless and asked if he was ready for the consequences of his refusal, reminding him that George W. Bush had said: "Either you are with us, or you are with the terrorists." He replied that he had hoped there would be no consequences, but would deal with them if they arrive. Hariri further said that he opposed the killing of all humans – Israeli, Palestinian, Syrian or Lebanese – and believed in dialogue as a solution. He further went on to say that Syria would have to stay in Lebanon for protection of Lebanon until they are no longer needed and Lebanon asks them to leave.

Lebanese Druze leader Walid Jumblatt, a recent recruit of the anti-Syrian opposition, emboldened by popular anger and civic action now being called Lebanon's Cedar Revolution, alleged in the wake of the assassination that on 26 August 2004 Syrian President Bashar al-Assad threatened Hariri, saying "[President of Lebanon] Lahoud is me. ... If you and Chirac want me out of Lebanon, I will break Lebanon." He was quoted as saying "When I heard him telling us those words, I knew that it was his condemnation of death." This meeting between Hariri and Assad, which had been on 26 August 2004, lasted for just fifteen minutes.

On 22 June 2005, Beirut International Airport was renamed Rafic Hariri International Airport. Additionally, Beirut General University hospital was renamed Rafiq Hariri Hospital. Rafic Hariri was succeeded by his son Saad Hariri as leader of the Future Party.

Corruption
Hariri was accused of corruption that plagued Lebanon during the Syrian occupation. Among the allegations made against him was that his wealth grew from less than $1 billion when he was appointed prime minister in 1992, to over $16 billion when he died. The Company for the Development and Reconstruction of Beirut's Central District, known as Solidere, in which Hariri is the primary shareholder, expropriated most property in the central business district of Beirut, compensating each owner with shares in the company which were worth as little as 15% of the property's value. That Hariri and his business associates profited immensely from this project was an open secret.

In 1996, at the beginning of Hariri’s second term as Prime Minister and Minister of Finance it was reported that $26 million had been embezzled from the Ministry of Finance.

Hariri and his protégés were not the only beneficiaries of this spending spree. In order to secure support from militia chieftains, and pro-Syrian ideologues that Damascus had installed in the government, Hariri allowed kickbacks from public spending to enrich all major government figures. Contracts for the import of petroleum were awarded to the two sons of President Elias Hrawi.

As result of the growing criticism and popular discontent with Hariri's policies, the government banned public demonstrations in 1994 and relied upon the Army to enforce the decree. In return for a relatively free hand in economic matters, Hariri cooperated with Syria's drive to consolidate its control over Lebanon. Under the guise of "regulating" the audiovisual media, the government placed control of all major television and radio stations in the hands of pro-Syrian elites. Supporters of Michel Aoun were also perpetually harassed and detained.

On 25 September 1996 Prime Minister Hariri’s government issued a decree ordering the closure of Lebanon’s 150 privately owned radio stations and 50 TV stations. This followed Information Minister Farid Makari’s 17 September order banning the broadcast of news programs. Licences were to be issued to Future Television owned by Hariri, the Christian owned Lebanese Broadcasting Corporation International (LBCI), Murr Television (MTV) owned by the brother of Michel Murr the interior minister, and the National Broadcasting Network (NBN) being set up by Nabih Berri.
The radio stations which were to be given licenses were Hariri’s Orient Radio, Berri’s NBN, and the Lebanese Forces’s Voice of Free Lebanon. It was estimated that the move would result in the loss of 5,000 jobs.

Personal life
Hariri married twice. He had six children. In 1965, he married an Iraqi woman, Nidal Bustani, who is the mother of his three sons; Bahaa (born 1967), who is a businessman, Saad, who succeeded his father as leader of the future movement, and Houssam—who died in a traffic accident in the US in the late 1980s. They divorced. He married his second spouse, Nazik Audi, in 1976 and she is the mother of three of Hariri's children: Ayman, Fahd and Hind.

From 1982 until his death, Hariri owned 2–8a Rutland Gate, a large house in London's Knightsbridge district. The house was gifted to the Crown Prince of Saudi Arabia, Sultan bin Abdulaziz, after Hariri's assassination.

Assassination

Among the dead were several of Hariri's bodyguards and his friend and former Minister of the Economy Bassel Fleihan. Hariri was buried along with his bodyguards, who died in the bombing, in a location near Mohammad Al-Amin Mosque.

A 2006 report by Serge Brammertz indicated that DNA evidence collected from the crime scene suggests that the assassination might be the act of a young male suicide bomber.

In its first two reports in 2014, the United Nations International Independent Investigation Commission indicated that the Syrian government may be linked to the assassination. Lawyers tasked with prosecuting those responsible for the 2005 bombing said they had received evidence linking Bashar Assad's phone to the case. In its tenth report, the UNIIIC concluded "that a network of individuals acted in concert to carry out the assassination of Rafiq Hariri.”

A Canadian Broadcasting Corporation news investigation claimed that the special UN investigation team had found evidence for the responsibility of Hezbollah in the assassination. A UN-backed tribunal issued four arrest warrants to members of Hezbollah.

Hezbollah blamed the assassination on Israel.

Alleged Hezbollah supporters Salim Jamil Ayyash, Hassan Habib Merhi, Hussein Hassan Oneissi, and Assad Hassan Sabra have been indicted for the assassination and were tried in absentia by the Special Tribunal for Lebanon.

Aftermath

Hariri was well regarded among international leaders, for example, he was a close friend of French President Jacques Chirac. Chirac was one of the first foreign dignitaries to offer condolences to Hariri's widow in person at her home in Beirut. The Special Tribunal for Lebanon was also created at his instigation. Syria was initially accused of the assassination, which led to the withdrawal of Syrian troops from Lebanon following widespread protests.

Major General Jamil Al Sayyed, then head of Lebanese General Security, Brigadier General Mustafa Hamdan, Major General Ali Hajj and Brigadier General Raymond Azar were all arrested in August 2005 at the request of German prosecutor Detlev Mehlis, who was carrying out the UN investigation about the assassination. Sayyed was one of the persons who decided to assassinate Rafik Hariri according to a leaked draft version of the Mehlis report along with other Syrian high-rank intelligence and security officers and officials, namely Assef Shawkat, Maher Assad, Hassan Khalil and Bahjat Suleyman. However, later reports about the assassination did not repeat the allegations against Jamil Al Sayyed and other three Lebanese generals. Four Lebanese generals were held in Roumieh prison, northeast of Beirut from 2005 to 2009. They were released from the prison due to lack of evidence in 2009.

Following Hariri's death, there were several other bombings and assassinations against minor anti-Syrian figures. These included Samir Kassir, George Hawi, Gebran Tueni, Pierre Amine Gemayel, Antoine Ghanem and Walid Eido. Assassination attempts were made on Elias Murr, May Chidiac, and Samir Shehade (who was investigating Hariri's death).

An indictment against alleged Hezbollah members Salim Jamil Ayyash, Mustafa Amine Badreddine, Hussein Hassan Oneissi, and Assad Hassan Sabra was issued and confirmed by the Pre-Trial Judge of the United Nations special tribunal (see Special Tribunal for Lebanon) in 2011. In February 2014, the case against Hassan Habib Merhi was joined with the Ayyash et al. case. Proceedings against the accused Mustafa Badreddine were terminated in July 2016 following credible reports of his death. Salim Jamil Ayyash, Hassan Habib Merhi, Hussein Hassan Oneissi, and Assad Hassan Sabra currently remain on trial in absentia.

Hezbollah accused Israel of the assassination of Hariri. According to Hezbollah officials, the assassination of Hariri was planned by the Mossad as a means of expelling the Syrian army from Lebanon. In August 2010, Hezbollah leader Hassan Nasrallah presented evidence, consisting of intercepted Israeli spy-drone video footage, which he said implicated Israel in the assassination of Hariri. After an altercation between male Tribunal staff and women at a gynecology clinic in October 2010, Hezbollah demanded that the Lebanese government stop all cooperation with the Special Tribunal, claiming the tribunal to be an infringement on Lebanese sovereignty by western governments. On 1 November 2010, a report was leaked by Al Akhbar, a local secular, leftist newspaper, stating that Hezbollah drafted plans for a quick takeover of the country in the case an indictment against its members is issued by the UN Special Tribunal. The report states that Hezbollah conducted a simulation of the plan on 28 October, immediately following a speech by its secretary general.

On the other side, it was revealed by leaked US embassy cables that then Egyptian General Intelligence Directorate director Omar Suleiman reported that Syria "desperately" wanted to stop the investigation of the Tribunal.

See also
 List of assassinated Lebanese politicians
 Hariri Tribunal, officially called the Special Tribunal for Lebanon

Notelist

References

Books 
Sallam, Qasim (1980). Al-Baath wal Watan Al-Arabi [Arabic, with French translation] ("The Baath and the Arab Homeland"). Paris: EMA. 
Stephan, Joseph S. (2006) Oeuvres et performances du president martyr Rafic Hariri, les performances economico-financieres avant Paris 2 et apres, le philanthrope batisseur
Blandford, Nicholas (2006). Killing Mr Lebanon: The Assassination of Rafik Hariri and Its Impact on the Middle East
Vloeberghs, Ward (2015). Architecture, Power and Religion in Lebanon: Rafiq Hariri and the Politics of Sacred Space in Beirut

External links

 Rafic Hariri  Official site with news, video, press releases, speeches, statements, government policy, Cabinet decisions and UN resolutions

Print articles
 Family of Slain Lebanese Leader Demands Probe into Killing -The Associated Press/New York Times 17 February 2005
 Death of Businessman By Ajami, Fouad The Wall Street Journal-17 February 2005 Page A12

1944 births
2005 deaths
Rafic
People from Sidon
21st-century Lebanese politicians
Prime Ministers of Lebanon
Finance ministers of Lebanon
Beirut Arab University alumni
Businesspeople in construction
Lebanese billionaires
American University of Beirut trustees
Future Movement politicians
Assassinated Lebanese politicians
Terrorism deaths in Lebanon
Lebanese terrorism victims
People murdered in Lebanon
Deaths by car bomb in Lebanon
Lebanese emigrants to Saudi Arabia
Naturalised citizens of Saudi Arabia
Lebanese mass media owners
Grand Crosses of the Order of the Star of Romania
Recipients of the Order of the Liberator General San Martin
Grand Croix of the Légion d'honneur
20th-century Lebanese businesspeople
20th-century Lebanese politicians